Opsaridium maculicauda is a species of ray-finned fish in the family Cyprinidae. It is found in the Kasai River in Democratic Republic of the Congo.

References

Opsaridium
Fish described in 1926
Fish of the Democratic Republic of the Congo
Endemic fauna of the Democratic Republic of the Congo